Robin David Scott (born 23 January 1973) is a former Australian politician. He was a Labor Party member of the Victorian Legislative Assembly between 2006 and 2022, representing the seat of Preston.

Early life
Scott was born in Melbourne, Victoria, and received a Bachelor of Arts majoring in politics from La Trobe University.

Scott was later hired in 1996 as an electorate officer, with Scott becoming secretary of the party's Preston branch.

Political career
In 2006, Robin Scott was selected as the Labor candidate for Preston, a safe seat being vacated by sitting member Michael Leighton. Scott has represented the seat since. Scott served as Victorian Labor's Shadow Minister for Finance and WorkCover after their loss at the 2010 state election.  On 4 December 2014 he was sworn in as Minister for Finance and Minister for Multicultural Affairs in the first Andrews Ministry. Following the 2018 state election, Scott became Assistant Treasurer and Minister for Veterans in the second Andrews Ministry. He resigned from his ministerial positions on 15 June 2020 following a hearing before the Independent Broad-based Anti-corruption Commission (IBAC) into political expenses and branch stacking.

In May 2022, Scott lost preselection for the 2022 state election and retired at the election.

References

External links
Personal website
Parliamentary voting record of Robin Scott at Victorian Parliament Tracker 

1973 births
Living people
Australian Labor Party members of the Parliament of Victoria
Members of the Victorian Legislative Assembly
21st-century Australian politicians
Politicians from Melbourne
La Trobe University alumni